Fölktergeist is a live album by Mägo de Oz, which was released in 2002.

Track listing

Disc one
 "Satania"
 "Maritornes"
 "El que quiera entender que entienda"
 "El Santo Grial"
 "El Lago"
 "Hasta que el cuerpo aguante"
 "El Cantar de la Luna Oscura"
 "La Leyenda de La Mancha"
 "Pensando en tí" (Cover of "Dust in the Wind" by Kansas)

Disc two
 "Jesús de Chamberí"
 "El pacto"
 "Réquiem"
 "La santa compaña"
 "Astaroth"
 "La danza del fuego"
 "Fiesta pagana"
 "Hasta que tu muerte nos separe"
 "Molinos de viento"

Certifications

References

Mägo de Oz albums
2002 live albums
Locomotive Music live albums